St. Francis Indian School is a K-12 Native American school in St. Francis, South Dakota. It is tribally controlled and is affiliated with the Bureau of Indian Education (BIE).

Lakota people are served by the school.

History
In 1886 the school, initially a Christian elementary school of St. Francis Mission meant to serve Native students with English as a second language, was established. It had 200-person boarding facilities, with all students boarding, and had one building, though a second was later added and the boarding facilities filled. A fire destroyed the existing facilities in January 1916. Concrete replacement facilities were built and school resumed in fall 1916. The high school classes began in 1931. It had a peak enrollment of 500 in the 1940s and 1950s. The dormitories were decommissioned in the 1960s after improvements to the roads were implemented. Tribal control came in 1979. Residents had a positive reception to gaining tribal control.

By 2004 the school began hiring teachers from other countries to fill vacancies.

Curriculum
In 1986, in addition to English and Lakota, the school had the following foreign languages available: German, Latin, Russian, and Spanish. Some languages classes were only open to high school students.

References

External links
 St. Francis Indian School

Public middle schools in South Dakota
Public high schools in South Dakota
Public K-12 schools in the United States
Boarding schools in South Dakota
Native American boarding schools
Native American history of South Dakota